Friedrich (Fritz) Bury (12 March 1763 – 18 May 1823) was a German artist born in Hanau. He studied first under his father Jean Jacques Bury, who was a goldsmith and professor in the Academy of Design in Hanau, and then with Johann Heinrich Wilhelm Tischbein. In 1780 he visited Düsseldorf, and two years later went to Rome; thence to Dresden, and finally settled in Berlin, where he was patronized by the Queen of Prussia. He painted historical pictures and portraits. A 'Cupid triumphant' by him is in the Hague Gallery.

Selected portraits

Other works

See also
 List of German painters

References

Attribution:
 

18th-century German painters
18th-century German male artists
German male painters
19th-century German painters
19th-century German male artists
1763 births
People from Hanau
1823 deaths